Ringland is a village and civil parish in Norfolk, England, and in the valley of the River Wensum, approximately  north-west of Norwich. Parts of the Wensum valley within the parish constitute a Site of Special Scientific Interest.

The villages name means 'land of Rymi's people'.

The parish church of St Peter's has a 13th-century tower and a 14th-15th century nave and chancel.

The higher terrain of Ringland Hills lies within the parish to the east of the village and north of the Wensum, and are thought to be a glacial terminal moraine, much the same as Cromer ridge. The soil here is sandy with flint pebbles. Painter Alfred Munnings produced a work entitled Ponies on Ringland Hills.

The village has extensive common land: a lower area on the river Wensum and an upper area with the remains of a Beaker pit in the direction of Weston Longville.

The river was originally crossed by a wooden footbridge (and a ford for horse-drawn traffic). This was replaced in the 1920s with a concrete structure which remains today. Rare concrete 'tank traps' from World War II still exist by the banks of the Wensum.

The village originally had two public houses, the King of Prussia and the Swan Inn. The King of Prussia was renamed 'The Union Jack' during the Second World War, and finally closed in the 1960s. The Swan remains to this day; attached is a restaurant run by the owners.

References

External links
Ringland website
Office for National Statistics & Norfolk County Council, 2001. "Census population and household counts for unparished urban areas and all parishes."

Broadland
Villages in Norfolk
Civil parishes in Norfolk